

Belgium
 Congo Free State – Théophile Wahis, Governor-General of the Congo Free State (1892–1908)

France
 French Somaliland – Léonce Lagarde, Governor of French Somaliland (1888–1899)
 Guinea – 
 Formerly Riviéres du Sud
 Noël-Eugène Ballay, Lieutenant-Governor of Guinea (1893–1895)
 Riviéres du Sud –
 Paul Jean François Cousturier, Lieutenant-Governor of Riviéres du Sud (1892–1893)
 Became Guinea

Portugal
 Angola – 
 Jaime Lôbo de Brito Godins, Governor-General of Angola (1892–1893)
 Álvaro Ferreira, Governor-General of Angola (1893–1896)

United Kingdom
 British Virgin Islands – Edward John Cameron, Administrator of the British Virgin Islands (1887–1894)
 India -
 Lagos Colony -
 Malta Colony
 Henry Augustus Smyth, Governor of Malta (1890–1893)
 Arthur Fremantle, Governor of Malta (1893–1899)
 New South Wales 
 Victor Villiers, Lord Jersey, Governor of New South Wales (1891–1893)
 Sir Robert Duff, Governor of New South Wales (1893–1895)
 Queensland – Field Marshal Sir Henry Norman, Governor of Queensland (1889–1895)
 Tasmania – Jenico Preston, Lord Gormanston, Governor of Tasmania (1893–1900)
 South Australia – Algernon Keith-Falconer, Lord Kintore, Governor of South Australia (1889–1895)
 Victoria – John Hope, Earl of Hopetoun, Governor of Victoria (1889–1895)
 Western Australia – Sir William Robinson, Governor of Western Australia (1890–1895)

Colonial governors
Colonial governors
1893